WPAT-FM (93.1 FM) – branded "93.1 Amor" – is a radio station that programs both a Spanish AC and tropical radio formats. Licensed to Paterson, New Jersey, the station is owned by the Spanish Broadcasting System and serves the New York metropolitan area. It has studios in Midtown Manhattan, and the transmitter is located at the Empire State Building.

WPAT-FM broadcasts in HD.

History
WPAT-FM signed on in 1957 with studios in Newark, New Jersey. Its frequency of 93.1 MHz had previously been assigned to Edwin Howard Armstrong's Alpine, New Jersey station, KE2XCC, until it went off the air in 1954. This was the second station to hold the WPAT-FM call sign, as an earlier WPAT-FM, originally WNNJ, had operated on 103.5 MHz from 1949 until its deletion in early 1951.

WPAT-FM eventually moved to studios on Church Street in Paterson, and later moved to studios at the four-tower transmitter site of its AM sister station at that time, 930 WPAT (AM), at 1396 Broad Street in Clifton, New Jersey. WPAT AM & FM were purchased by Capital Cities Communications in 1961. In 1985, Capital Cities announced that it would buy ABC. As a result of Federal Communications Commission regulations at the time, the company decided to sell WPAT AM & FM because ABC already owned 770 WABC and 95.5 WPLJ in New York City. The WPAT stations were sold to Park Communications.

On January 19, 1996, at 11:59 pm, WPAT-FM ceased being an English-language station when control was switched over to current owners Spanish Broadcasting System. WPAT-FM DJ Karen Carson did the last air shift for the station's adult contemporary format that day, and operations director Ken Mackenzie gave a farewell speech right before the station signed off. Immediately after the station signed off from Clifton, a new Spanish-language adult contemporary format signed on from Manhattan with the branding "Suave 93.1" ("Smooth 93.1"). Eventually, on February 4, 1998, the station's branding was changed to "Amor 93.1" ("Love 93.1") and in January 2002, returned to "93.1 Amor" ("93.1 Love").

References

External links

PAT
PAT
PAT-FM
Radio stations established in 1957
Hispanic and Latino American culture in New York City
1957 establishments in New Jersey
HD Radio stations
Tropical music radio stations
Mainstream adult contemporary radio stations in the United States